The list of stolpersteine in Prague-Břevnov, Bubeneč and Dejvice contains the stumbling blocks that were placed in the Prague district of Břevnov and Bubeneč as well as in the cadastral district of Dejvice. Břevnov has partially belonged to Prague since 2002, Dejvice is entirely part of Prague 6. Bubeneč was divided between Prague 6 and Prague 7. The stumbling blocks remind and make aware of the fate of the people who were murdered, deported, expelled or driven into suicide by the national socialists. The Stolpersteine were designed and placed by Gunter Demnig.

The Czech stumbling block project Stolpersteine.cz was launched in 2008 by Česká unie židovské mládeže (Czech Union of Jewish Youth) under the patronage of the Prague mayor. The Stolpersteine lie in front of the victim's last freely-chosen place of residence. In Czech, the stumbling blocks are called Kameny zmizelých; stones of the disappeared.

The tables are partially sortable; The sorting is carried out alphabetically according to the family name.

Břevnov

Bubeneč

Dejvice

Date of placement 
The Stolpersteine in Prague was personally placed by Gunter Demnig on the following days: October 8, 2008, November 7, 2009, June 12, 2010, July 13–15, 2011 and July 17, 2013 (as indicated on the website of the artist Events). Further placements were made on 28 October 2012 but are not mentioned on the website.

Sources 
 Holocaust.cz, tschechische Holocaust-Datenbank (deutschsprachige Version)
 Stolpersteine.eu, Demnigs Website

External links

References 

Břevnov, Bubeneč and Dejvice